FWQ may refer to:
 Flight West Airlines, a defunct Australian air line
 Rostraver Airport, in Pennsylvania, United States